Alexander Milne Calder  (August 23, 1846 – June 4, 1923) (MILL-nee) was a Scottish American sculptor best known for the architectural sculpture of Philadelphia City Hall. Both his son, Alexander Stirling Calder, and grandson, Alexander "Sandy" Calder, became significant sculptors in the 20th century.

Biography
Alexander Milne Calder was born in Aberdeen, Scotland, the son of a tombstone carver.  He began his career in Scotland, working for sculptor John Rhind, the father of sculptor J. Massey Rhind while attending the Royal Academy in Edinburgh. He moved to London and worked on the Albert Memorial.  Calder emigrated to the United States in 1868 and settled in Philadelphia, where he studied with Joseph A. Bailly, and took classes (as would his son Alexander Stirling Calder) at the Pennsylvania Academy of Fine Arts.

In 1873, he was hired by architect John McArthur, Jr., to produce models for the sculptures adorning Philadelphia City Hall. The commission required more than 250 marble and bronze pieces and took Calder twenty years to complete. That same year, Calder was commissioned by the forerunner of Philadelphia's current Association for Public Art, the Fairmount Park Art Association, to create an equestrian statue of Major General George Gordon Meade for Fairmount Park. Then in 1875, he won the competition for the colossal (37 foot tall) bronze statue of William Penn that was to crown the new City Hall's tower. That portrait sculpture remains to this day the largest atop any building in the world.

Alexander Milne Calder is buried in West Laurel Hill Cemetery in suburban Philadelphia's Bala Cynwyd, Pennsylvania.

Notable works
Philadelphia City Hall architectural sculpture, John McArthur, Jr. architect, Philadelphia, Pennsylvania  1873 – 1893.
Major General George Gordon Meade, West Fairmount Park, Philadelphia, Pennsylvania  1887.
William Warner Tomb, Laurel Hill Cemetery, Philadelphia, Pennsylvania  1889.
William Penn, 37-foot-tall statue atop Philadelphia City Hall, Philadelphia, Pennsylvania, placed in 1894.

Images

Sources
Bach, Penny Balkin, Public Art in Philadelphia, Temple University Press, Philadelphia, Pennsylvania, 1992 
Craven,  Wayne, Sculpture in America, Thomas Y Crowell Co, NY, NY 1968 
Fairmount Park Association, Sculpture of a City: Philadelphia's Treasures in Bronze and Stone,  Walker Publishing Co., Inc, NY. NY  1974 
Hayes, Margaret Calder  Three Alexander Calders, Paul S Eriksson Publisher, Middlebury, Vermont,  1977 
Kvaran and Lockley, A Guide to Architectural Sculpture in America,  unpublished manuscript
Williams, Oliver P., County Courthouses of Pennsylvania: A Guide, Stackpole Books, Mechanicsburg, PA 2001

References

External links

 Biography at West Laurel Hill Cemetery web site
Alexander Milne Calder page at Philadelphia Public Art
Plaque honoring Alexander Milne Calder at Philadelphia Public Art

1846 births
1923 deaths
Artists from Aberdeen
American architectural sculptors
Scottish emigrants to the United States
Scottish sculptors
Scottish male sculptors
Pennsylvania Academy of the Fine Arts alumni
Artists from Philadelphia
20th-century American sculptors
20th-century American male artists
19th-century American sculptors
American male sculptors
Sculptors from Pennsylvania
19th-century American male artists
Burials at West Laurel Hill Cemetery